Cricket is a minor sport in Canada which is unusual among the former Dominions of the British Empire in not having adopted cricket as a major sport—in contrast with Australia, New Zealand, India, Pakistan, Sri Lanka, British West Indies and South Africa.

History

The earliest reports of cricket in Canada date from 1785 where games seem to have taken place in Montreal. The first reference to cricket being played on an organized basis is in 1834 when a club was founded in Toronto and there are reports of matches being played in Hamilton and Guelph.

In 1840, there was a game between the Toronto and New York clubs.  Similar strength teams played each other in 1844 in what has been called the first-ever cricket international. In 1867, Canadian prime minister John A. MacDonald and his cabinet declared cricket to be Canada’s first official sport.

Cricket Canada is the governing body of the sport of cricket in Canada. It was established in 1892 and has its current headquarters in Toronto, Ontario. The British Columbia Mainland Cricket League was founded in 1914, and is now the second-largest cricket league in North America. Cricket Canada is Canada's representative at the International Cricket Council and has been an associate member of that body since 1968. It is included in the ICC Americas region. Prior to November 2007, the organization was known as the Canadian Cricket Association.

The most famous Canadian cricketer is John Davison, who was born in Canada and participated in the Cricket World Cup in both 2003 and 2007. At the 2003 World Cup, Davison hit the fastest century in tournament history against the West Indies in what was ultimately a losing cause. In that World Cup he also smashed a half-century at a strike rate of almost 200 against New Zealand. One year later, in the ICC Intercontinental Cup against the USA, he proved the difference between the two sides, taking 17 wickets for 137 runs as well as scoring 84 runs of his own. In the 2007 Cricket World Cup in the West Indies, Davison scored the second-fastest half-century against New Zealand. Canada has participated in the 1979, 2003, 2007 and 2011 Cricket World Cups.

Domestic competitions
The first Canadian Dominion inter-provincial cricket tournament was held in Montreal in the month of August 1964. One of the best matches of the tournament was Manitoba defeating British Columbia at Lower Canada College grounds in Montreal. 
Cricket Canada organizes domestic inter-provincial cricket in Canada. In 2008, Cricket Canada has introduced two domestic competitions that are Scotia Shield U-19 and National T20 Championship. National T20 Championship is a Twenty20 format competition with eight domestic teams. Until 2006, the Under-18 National Tournament in Canada was called as Canada Cup.

In 2009, a new professional Twenty20 league was formed. Known as the TJT National Cricket League (TJT NCL), the league initially consisted of six teams – the Warriors, Titans, Gladiators, Royals, Chiefs, and Kings. About 90 professional cricket players were drafted from across Canada in the inaugural draft. The inaugural season commenced play August 7, 2009 at G. Ross Lord Park in Toronto. The six teams played each other in a round robin match over the season which lasted six weeks. The top four teams Gladiators, Warriors, Titans, and Kings played in semi-finals and the final match was played on September 27, 2009 between the Titans and the Kings. The 2009 TJT NCL championship was won by the Kings.

In 2012, the CIBC National Cricket League was introduced by Cricket Canada as the new major domestic competition played mid-summer in Toronto. Consisting of five franchise teams to represent cricketing regions across the country; Pacific Edge (BC), Western Stallions (AB), Prairie Fire (MB/SK), Central Shield (ON), Eastern Fury (Atlantic – QC, NB, PE, NS, NL). The NCL is broken up into two competition formats, a T20 competition and a One Day competition.

In February 2018, the International Cricket Council (ICC) sanctioned the Global T20 Canada, the first franchise-based Twenty20 league in North America.

Domestic competitions in Canada include: 

 CIBC National Cricket League
 Scotia Shield U-19
 TJT National Cricket League
 Atlantic T20
 Maritime M40 Championship

Cricket grounds

Until September 2006, Toronto Cricket, Skating and Curling Club Ground was the only ground in Canada approved to host official One Day Internationals. It was joined at this date by the Maple Leaf Cricket Club in King City, Ontario.

National team
While Canada is not sanctioned to play Test matches, the team does take part in One Day International matches and also in first-class games (in the ICC Intercontinental Cup) against other non-Test-playing opposition, with the rivalry against the United States cricket team being as strong in cricket as it is in other team sports. The match between these two nations is in fact the oldest international fixture in cricket, having first been played in 1844. This international fixture even predates the Olympics by over 50 years.

Canada is one of the team's in Division 1 of Associate Members of International Cricket Council who has One Day International and T20 International status.

Canadian cricket has tended to take a lower profile than most other sports, and the team tends to be composed of expatriates from more successful cricketing nations either trying to achieve a level of international experience or having been deemed too old for their respective national teams. The 2003 World Cup squad, for example, contained players born in Sri Lanka, India, Pakistan, and the West Indies.

Men's

Canada Senior Men's team qualified in April 2009 at the ICC World Cup qualifier held in South Africa to compete in 2011 World Cup, their third World Cup appearance in a row.

Women's

Canada has traditionally had a strong Women's team. Also The Canadian Under 19 team have competed in the Under 19 World Cup on three occasions. In 2002, they were eliminated in the first round, meaning they competed in the plate competition, in which they did not win a game. They repeated this performance in the 2004 competition.  The Canadian u19 team competed in the 2014 u19 World Cup in Dubai, finishing 15th.

The Canadian women's cricket team made their international debut in September 2006 in a three match series of one-day games against Bermuda to decide which team would represent the Americas region in the Women's Cricket World Cup Qualifier in Ireland in 2007. Canada started well, with a five wicket win in the first win, but Bermuda came back with 24 run win in the second. The third game went down to the wire, with Bermuda triumphing by just 3 runs.

See also

 Sport in Canada
 List of Canadian first-class cricketers

References

External links
Official site of Cricket Canada
CricInfo on Canadian cricket
TJT National Cricket League website
Cricket and the Meaning of Life, a 2005 National Film Board of Canada documentary about cricket in Toronto